Salema (pronounced "Saleman", Hindi: सलेमां) is a village in Shahkot, a city in Jalandhar District of Indian state of Punjab.

Geography
Salema lies near the Shahkot-Nakodar-Pandori road, which is almost 1 km from it.

The nearest railway station to Salema is Malsian railway station at a distance of 9 km.

Villages in Jalandhar district